Fernanda Rodrigues de Souza (born 18 June 1984) is a Brazilian actress and TV host.

Career

Filmography

References

External links

1984 births
Living people
Actresses from São Paulo
Brazilian people of Portuguese descent
Brazilian film actresses
Brazilian television actresses
Brazilian stage actresses
21st-century Brazilian LGBT people
Brazilian LGBT actors
Brazilian bisexual people
Bisexual actresses